Kosmos 101 ( meaning Cosmos 101), also known as DS-P1-Yu No.4 was a Soviet satellite which was used as a radar calibration target for tests of anti-ballistic missiles. It was built by the Yuzhnoye Design Bureau, and launched in 1965 as part of the Dnepropetrovsk Sputnik programme.

The launch of Kosmos 101 was conducted using a Kosmos-2I 63S1 carrier rocket, which flew from Site 86/1 at Kapustin Yar. The launch occurred at 06:14 GMT on 21 December 1965.

It decayed from orbit on 12 July 1966. Kosmos 101 was the fourth of seventy nine DS-P1-Yu satellites to be launched, of which all but seven were successful.

See also

 1965 in spaceflight

References

Spacecraft launched in 1965
Kosmos satellites
1965 in the Soviet Union
Dnepropetrovsk Sputnik program